The English cricket team toured the United Arab Emirates (UAE) to play Pakistan in October and November 2015. The Pakistan cricket team played their 'home' fixtures in the UAE due to ongoing security concerns in Pakistan since the 2009 attack on the Sri Lanka national cricket team.

The tour consisted of three Test matches, four One Day Internationals and three Twenty20 Internationals. They also played two two-day tour matches against a Pakistan A side, a 50-over match against Hong Kong, and a Twenty20 match against the United Arab Emirates. Pakistan played a 50-over match against Nepal and a 20-over match against Hong Kong.

Squads

England's Zafar Ansari was ruled out of the Test series following a hand injury. He was replaced by Samit Patel. Shoaib Malik was added to Pakistan's Test squad on 6 October. England's Steven Finn was ruled out of the tour with a foot injury and was replaced in the Test and ODI squads by Chris Jordan. Pakistan's Bilal Asif was added to the Test squad on 19 October after undergoing an evaluation on his bowling action. Pakistan's Imad Wasim was ruled out of the ODI and T20I matches due to hand injury. Umar Akmal was added to Pakistan's T20I squad, after being cleared by the Pakistan Cricket Board.

Tour matches

Two-day: Pakistan A vs England XI

Two-day: Pakistan A vs England XI

One-day: England XI vs Hong Kong

Tour match: Pakistanis vs Nepal

Twenty20: Pakistanis vs Hong Kong

Twenty20: United Arab Emirates vs England XI

Test series

1st Test

2nd Test

3rd Test

ODI series

1st ODI

2nd ODI

3rd ODI

4th ODI

T20I series

1st T20I

2nd T20I

3rd T20I

References

External links
 Series home at ESPNcricinfo

2015 in Pakistani cricket
2015 in English cricket
International cricket competitions in 2015–16
2015-16
England 2015